, known internationally as Bayside Shakedown, is a 1998 Japanese film. The film was adapted from the 1997 television series Bayside Shakedown.

Plot
The film continues a few months after the end of the TV series. The main character Detective Sergeant Shunsaku Aoshima has worked his way back up into the investigative division of the Wangan Precinct of the Tokyo Metropolitan Police Department, after being demoted back to patrol duty for insubordination.

Shortly after the movie begins, a body is found floating in a river near the edge of the precinct's jurisdiction. However, in the spirit of the series, the main concern of the officers on the scene is getting to the body before their counterparts from the other precinct on the other side of the river get to it. The scene eventually degenerates into a cross-river shouting match over bullhorns between the officers from the two precincts. The brass at Wangan Station turn out to be less than happy when their officers manage to recover the body (which has had a teddy bear crudely stuffed into its stomach) as it would require a special investigation, which would drain more from the station's already tight budget. At the same time, the station is in an uproar as officers find that someone has been stealing the receipts for on the job expenses that they had originally intended to file for reimbursement.

Things are further complicated when the Assistant Commissioner is kidnapped and the investigative team from Metropolitan Police headquarters moves into Wangan Station. The investigation is led by Superintendent Shinji Muroi, whom Aoshima befriended in the TV series. Having promised Aoshima that he would try to reform the bureaucratic mess within the police department and force the local and headquarters officers to work together as equals, Muroi finds that his promise increasingly hard to keep as his decisions are continuously overruled from above by superiors who insist on playing everything by the book. It becomes apparent that Muroi's superiors are setting him up to take the fall in the event the investigation fails.

The stratification in the department becomes apparent when the investigators from headquarters immediately delegate the most menial of tasks to the local officers, while receiving special treatment enjoying gourmet bentos while the locals are forced to dine on instant ramen. The locals are forced to work multiple cases at the same time, and find themselves berated by their superiors when mistakes are inevitably made.

The film goes on to take on issues such as disaffected youth unable to differentiate between reality and video games, overprotective parents, strange internet subcultures; and on more lighthearted notes, the lack of sidearms, otaku obsessed with cosplay, media frenzies, and even overtly melodramatic movie scenes, as Aoshima and his fellow officers continue to press on through the absurdity.

Cast
 Yūji Oda as Sergeant Shunsaku Aoshima
 Toshirō Yanagiba as Superintendent Shinji Muroi
 Eri Fukatsu as Sergeant Sumire Onda
 Miki Mizuno as Yukino Kashiwagi
 Yūsuke Santamaria as Inspector Masayoshi Mashita
 Kyōko Koizumi as Manami Hyuga
 Chosuke Ikariya as Senior Inspector Heihachiro Waku
 Kenta Satoi as Section Chief Uozumi
 Toshio Kakei as Superintendent Shinjo
 Soichiro Kitamura as Chief Kanda
 Takehiko Ono as Division Chief Hakamada
 Satoru Saito as Assistant Chief Akiyama
 Masane Tsukayama as Shizuo Ikegami

Release
Odoru daisosasen - The Movie was released in Japan on 31 October 1998 with a 119 minute running time by Toho. The film was followed by the sequel Bayside Shakedown 2 in 2003.

Reception
Odoru daisosasen – The Movie won several awards. These included "Reader's Choice Award - Best Film" from Mainichi Film Concours, and three Japanese Academy Awards for Best Supporting Actor (Chosuke Ikariya), Best Sound, and Most Popular Performer (Yuji Oda).

References

Footnotes

Sources

External links
 
 Love HK Film's review

1998 films
1990s Japanese-language films
Japanese crime comedy films
1990s parody films
Police detective films
Films set in Tokyo
Films directed by Katsuyuki Motohiro
1990s crime comedy films
1998 comedy films
1990s Japanese films